Planet 7 is a compilation album by dance/ambient band System 7 available only as a download from the iTunes Store. Four of the tracks were previously available on a download-only EP, AAWDLC002, available from the A-Wave online store, released simultaneously with Encantado.

Track listing

External links 

 Planet 7 • discography on the official System 7 website

1996 compilation albums
System 7 (band) albums